Your Obedient Servant is a 1917 American silent drama film directed by Edward H. Griffith and starring Claire Adams, Pat O'Malley and Helen Pillsbury.

Cast
 Claire Adams 
 Pat O'Malley	
 Helen Pillsbury as 	
 Charles R. Moore 
 Don Fulano as Black Beauty

References

Bibliography
 Robert B. Connelly. The Silents: Silent Feature Films, 1910-36, Volume 40, Issue 2. December Press, 1998.

External links
 

1917 films
1917 drama films
1910s English-language films
American silent feature films
Silent American drama films
American black-and-white films
Films directed by Edward H. Griffith
Edison Studios films
1910s American films